The Ngameni are an indigenous Australian people of South Australia who once spoke the Ngameni language.

Country
According to Norman Tindale's estimation, the Ngameni held  of tribal territory, along the southern edge of Goyder Lagoon, and on the Warburton River, and Lakes Howitt and Berlino. The northern reach extended to Pandipandi and, over the border into what is now southwest Queensland, the area south of Birdsville and Miranda.

Social organization and customs
Both circumcision and subincision were integral parts of Ngameni rites of
initiation.

Alternative names
 Ngamini, Ngaminni, Gnameni, Ngnaminni
 A:mini, Aumini, Auminie, Aumine, Amini
 Ominee
 Ahminie, Ahminnie
 Uminnie
 Agaminni
 Awmani

Some words
 chookeroo. (kangaroo)
 kinthalla (tame/wild dog)
 appurree (father)
 andree. (mother)

Notes

Citations

Sources

Aboriginal peoples of South Australia